Planet Ice is a chain of ice rinks in the United Kingdom (UK). The company has historically had a working relationship with the English Ice Hockey Association (EIHA) and several Planet Ice facilities have served as home ice to EIHA teams.

Arenas
There are currently fourteen Planet Ice Arenas in operation in the UK:

Planet Ice Altrincham in Altrincham, Greater Manchester
Planet Ice Silverdome Arena in Basingstoke, Hampshire
Blackburn Arena in Blackburn, Lancashire
Planet Ice Bristol at Cribbs Causeway in Bristol
Planet Ice Cannock in Cannock, Staffordshire
Planet Ice Coventry in Coventry, West Midlands 
Planet Ice Gillingham in Gillingham, Kent
Planet Ice Gosport in Gosport, Hampshire
Planet Ice Hemel Hempstead in Hemel Hempstead, Hertfordshire
 Planet Ice Leeds in Leeds, West Yorkshire
 Planet Ice Arena Milton Keynes in Milton Keynes, Buckinghamshire
Planet Ice Peterborough in Peterborough, Cambridgeshire
Planet Ice Solihull in Solihull, West Midlands
Planet Ice Uttoxeter in Uttoxeter, Staffordshire
 Planet Ice Widnes in Widnes, Cheshire

Former Arenas
Planet Ice Birmingham in Birmingham, West Midlands, closed in 2003 following a fire. The building was reopened in late 2009 by a subsidiary company of Arena Group under the name of The Leisurebox. This venture was unsuccessful and the rink closed again in May 2014.

Planet Ice operated Ryde Arena as “Planet Ice Isle of Wight” in Ryde, Isle of Wight from February 2001 to March 2015.

Future

Heath Rhodes, the Chief Operations Officer, advised on 8 May 2019, that Planet Ice would be reviewing its future relationship with all EIHL teams operating from its buildings because the Milton Keynes consortium licence was rejected for the 2019–20 EIHL season.

References

External links
Planet Ice official website

Sports venues in the United Kingdom